Yuebeipotamon calciatile is a species of potamid crab from hill streams and pools in north Guangdong, China. Although essentially a freshwater crab, its long legs are believed to allow it to easily walk over land between streams. It was first discovered in a Chinese pet market. It is the only species in the genus Yuebeipotamon.

References 

Potamoidea
Monotypic crustacean genera